Following is a list of senators of Vosges, people who have represented the department of Vosges in the Senate of France.

Third Republic

Senators for Vosges under the French Third Republic were:

 Nicolas Claude (1876–1888)
 Claude Claudot (1876–1879)
 Eustache Georges (1876–1891)
 Christian Kiener (1882–1896)
 Charles Ferry (1888–1891)
 Jules Ferry (1891–1893)
 Alfred Brugnot (1891–1903)
 Albert Ferry en 1893)
 Paul Frogier de Ponlevoy (1894–1909)
 Louis Parisot (1896–1909)
 Jules Méline (1903–1925)
 Thierry Comte d'Alsace (1909–1934)
 Henry Boucher (1909–1920)
 Paul Lederlin (1920–1927)
 Maurice Flayelle (1926–1938)
 Adrien Richard (1927–1940)
 André Barbier (1934–1940)
 Louis Gaillemin (1936–1940)

Fourth Republic

Senators for Vosges under the French Fourth Republic were:

 Henri Poincelot (1946–1948)
 Jean-Marie Grenier (1946–1952)
 Michel Madelin (1948–1952)
 Louis Courroy (1952–1959)
 Henri Parisot (1952–1959)

Fifth Republic 
Senators for Vosges under the French Fifth Republic:

References

Sources

 
Lists of members of the Senate (France) by department